Bronze star may refer to:

 Bronze Star Medal, a U.S. military decoration
 Bronze service star, an attachment worn on campaign medals and service decorations
 Bronze star, Canadian life saving award of the Royal Life Saving Society of Canada
 Bronze Bauhinia Star, the lowest grade of the Bauhinia Star of Hong Kong

See also
 Bronze Medal (disambiguation)
 Bronze Medallion (disambiguation)
 Bronze Award (disambiguation)
 Silver Star (disambiguation)
 Gold Star (disambiguation)
 Bronze (disambiguation)
 Star (disambiguation)